Tomasz Mruczkowski (born 3 June 1966) is a Polish rower. He competed in the men's coxed pair event at the 1992 Summer Olympics.

References

1966 births
Living people
Polish male rowers
Olympic rowers of Poland
Rowers at the 1992 Summer Olympics
Sportspeople from Gdańsk